The Terry Fox Laboratory (TFL) is the major research unit of the British Columbia Cancer Agency.

The TFL was established in 1981 when "a gift of one million dollars from the province of British Columbia to the Marathon of Hope (with additional funds raised elsewhere)" was used to renovate an old bakery and equip 1,800 square metres of laboratory and office space. The TFL is now housed at the British Columbia Cancer Research Centre at 675 West 10th Avenue, Vancouver, and occupies a total of ~. It is composed of 13 senior scientists, over 46 graduate students, 32 post-doctoral fellows and approximately 53 additional technical and support personnel.

The establishment of TFL was sparked with a donation in 1980 of $1,000,000 from the provincial government to the Terry Fox Marathon of Hope. The Terry Fox Laboratory is privileged to be one of only a handful of organizations permitted to use the name of Terry Fox, the young man who set out to run across Canada after losing a leg to cancer.

External links
 official web site

References

Terry Fox
Medical and health organizations based in British Columbia
Cancer organizations based in Canada